Motor Trend is an Italian automotive interest television channel owned by Warner Bros. Discovery Italia.

History
The channel began broadcasting on 29 April 2018, replacing Focus after the end of that brand licensing agreement, which was taken over by Mediaset.

On 1 April 2019, Motor Trend was converted in HD on satellite.

On 21 December 2019, Motor Trend replaced Alpha on channel 59 of DTT. On channel 56, it was replaced by HGTV on 2 February 2020.

On 1 July 2021, following a reorganization of some Sky channels, HGTV moves to LCN 419.

Programming 

 Chasing Classic Cars
 Wheeler Dealers
 American Chopper
 Bike N' Furious: pazzi a due ruote
 Car Crash Tv
 Come ti rifaccio l'auto
 Diesel Brothers
 Driving Wild
 Fast N' Loud
 Gli eroi dell'asfalto
 Goblin garage
 I re della strada
 Iron garage
 L'impero delle macchine
 Meccanici allo Sbando
 Mega Race
 Mega trasporti
 Mega veicoli
 Officine da Incubo
 Real Fast, Real Furious
 Salt Lake Garage
 Supercar: auto da sogno

References

External links
 

Motor Trend Group
Television channels in Italy
Italian-language television stations
Television channels and stations established in 2018
Warner Bros. Discovery EMEA